is a metro station on the Osaka Metro located in Shinsaibashi, Chūō-ku, Osaka, Japan.

Lines

 (Station number: M19)
] (Station number: N15)
 (Station number: Y14)

For the purpose of fare calculation, Shinsaibashi Station is treated as the same station as Yotsubashi Station on the Yotsubashi Line.

History
May 20, 1933 - The Midōsuji Line from transient Umeda Station to Shinsaibashi Station opened.
December 11, 1996 - The Tsurumi-ryokuchi Line from Kyobashi to Shinsaibashi was opened, and the line was renamed the Nagahori Tsurumi-ryokuchi Line.
August 29, 1997 - The Nagahori Tsurumi-ryokuchi Line from Shinsaibashi to Taisho and from Tsurumi-ryokuchi and Kadoma-minami were opened.
It was announced in 2014 that the Midōsuji Line will get platform screen doors installed at the station.

Layout
This station has an island platform with two tracks for each line.  The one for the Nagahori Tsurumi-ryokuchi Line is fenced with platform gates.
Midōsuji Line (M19)

Nagahori Tsurumi-ryokuchi Line (N15)

Surroundings
Daimaru
North Building
Head Building
South Building
Tokyu Hands
Amerikamura
Shinsaibashisuji Shopping Arcade
Crysta Nagahori
OPA
Camera Naniwa
Hotel Nikko Osaka

References

Chūō-ku, Osaka
Osaka Metro stations
Railway stations in Japan opened in 1933